Andrea Cesaro (born 10 April 1986) is an Italian footballer who most recently played for Celano.

Biography
Born in Rome, Lazio, Cesaro started his career with A.S. Roma. In 2002, he was released. He then played for Serie D team Celano. In July 2005 he was loaned to Internazionale's youth team but returned to Celano in mid-season. The club won promotion to Serie C2 as playoff winner in 2006.

In 2007–08 season, he was sold to Serie C1 team Salernitana in co-ownership deal but bought back by Celano in June 2008.

Honours
Serie C1: 2008

References

External links
 Football.it Profile 
 

Italian footballers
A.S. Roma players
Celano F.C. Marsica players
Inter Milan players
U.S. Salernitana 1919 players
Association football midfielders
Footballers from Rome
1986 births
Living people